The 2020 Bellatorum Resources Pro Classic was a professional tennis tournament played on outdoor hard courts. It was the fourth edition of the tournament which was part of the 2020 ITF Women's World Tennis Tour. It took place in Tyler, Texas, United States between 26 October and 1 November 2020.

Singles main-draw entrants

Seeds

 1 Rankings are as of 19 October 2020.

Other entrants
The following players received wildcards into the singles main draw:
  Hailey Baptiste
  Fernanda Contreras
  Varvara Lepchenko
  Katie Volynets

The following player received entry as a junior exempt:
  Diane Parry

The following player received entry as a special exempt:
  Catherine Bellis

The following players received entry from the qualifying draw:
  Georgina García Pérez
  Mayo Hibi
  Jamie Loeb
  María Camila Osorio Serrano
  Ankita Raina
  Peyton Stearns
  Clara Tauson
  Renata Zarazúa

The following players received entry as lucky losers:
  Verónica Cepede Royg
  Paula Kania-Choduń
  Conny Perrin

Champions

Singles

 Ann Li def.  Marta Kostyuk, 7–5, 1–6, 6–3

Doubles

 Allura Zamarripa /  Maribella Zamarripa def.  Paula Kania-Choduń /  Katarzyna Piter, 6–3, 5–7, [11–9]

References

External links
 2020 Bellatorum Resources Pro Classic at ITFtennis.com
 Official website

2020 ITF Women's World Tennis Tour
2020 in American tennis
October 2020 sports events in the United States
November 2020 sports events in the United States